Niwari is a town and a nagar panchayat in Niwari district in Indian state of Madhya Pradesh. It is administrative headquarter of Niwari district. It is adjacent to the Jhansi and Mahoba districts of Uttar Pradesh.

Demographics
As of the 2001 Census of India, Niwari had a population of 20,711 with the 606,00 km2 area. Males constitute 53% of the population and females 47%. Niwari has an average literacy rate of 60%, higher than the national average of 59.5%: male literacy is 69%, and female literacy is 50%. In Niwari, 7% of the population is under 6 years of age.

References

Cities and towns in Niwari district